Chanakyaniti (written 4th–3rd century BCE) is a collection of aphorisms written by Chanakya. Its first European translation was done in Greek language in the 19th century.

References

Further reading

Hindu texts
Ancient Indian literature
Sanskrit texts
Political books
Military strategy books
Sanskrit books
Books of aphorisms